Heart of a Dog (translit. Sobachye serdtse) is a black-and-white 1988 Soviet television film directed by Vladimir Bortko. It is based on Mikhail Bulgakov's novel Heart of a Dog.

Premiering show of the film aired on 20 November 1988 at 18:45 on the Central Television Programme One. The film consisted of two episodes. The novel written in 1925 was censored in the Soviet Union, but at times of perestroika shown on the Soviet television.

Plot
The film is set in Moscow not long after the October Revolution where a complaining stray dog looks for food and shelter. A well-off, well-known surgeon Philipp Philippovich Preobrazhensky happens to need a dog and with a piece of sausage lures the animal to his big house with annexed practice. The dog is named Sharik and well taken care of by the doctor's maids, but still wonders why he is there. He finds out too late he is needed as a test animal: the doctor implants a pituitary gland and testicles of a recently deceased alcoholic and petty criminal Klim Chugunkin into Sharik.

Sharik proceeds to become more and more human during the next days. After his transition to human is complete, it turns out that he inherited all the negative traits of the donor – bad manners, aggressiveness, use of profanity, heavy drinking – but still hates cats. He picks for himself the absurd name Poligraf Poligrafovich Sharikov, starts working at the "Moscow Cleansing Sub-Department responsible for eliminating vagrant quadrupeds (cats, etc.)" and associating with revolutionaries, who plot to drive Preobrazhensky out of his big apartment. Eventually he turns the life in the professor's house into a nightmare by stealing money, breaking his furniture, flooding the apartment during a cat chase and blackmailing into marriage a girl he met at the cinema.

Preobrazhensky and his friend and assistant, Dr. Bormental, see all their efforts to reform Sharikov fail.

After a series of increasingly implacable conflicts, Preobrazhensky learns that Sharikov had attempted to denounce him to the Soviet secret police. He then demands that Sharikov immediately leaves the apartment for good. Sharikov angrily refuses and draws a revolver. An infuriated Bormental attacks Sharikov and, after a short but violent fight, subdues him. The professor then chooses to reverse the procedure.

Sharikov turns back into a dog. As Sharik, he does remember little about what has happened to him, but isn't much concerned about that. To his content he is left to live in the professor's apartment.

Cast

Yevgeny Yevstigneyev as Professor Philipp Philippovich Preobrazhensky
Boris Plotnikov as Dr. Ivan Arnoldovich Bormental, the professor's assistant
Vladimir Tolokonnikov as Polygraph Polygraphovich Sharikov
Nina Ruslanova as Darya Petrovna Ivanova, a cook in the professor's apartment
Roman Kartsev as Schwonder, a chairman of the building committee
Olga Melikhova as Zinaida Prokofievna Bunina, a housemaid and the professor's helper during surgeries
 (voice-over for Melikhova performed by Svetlana Smirnova)

Carray as Sharik, a stray dog
Anzhelika Nevolina as Vasnetsova, a typist out of the office
Vladimir Fyodorov as being (Sharik at transitional stage)

Details
 This screen version of M. Bulgakov's novel is famous for its attention to the original text: practically nothing was deleted for adaptation. However, there are some differences between the novel and the film (in the novel Bormental didn't meet the typist in the cinema and Pyotr Alexandrovich – an important official cured by Preobrazhensky – didn't look like Joseph Stalin as it was shown in the film). The episode in which Bormental presents Sharikov who plays balalaika didn't exist in the novel. However, the phrases of Bormental were taken from the diary of Bormental which was in the original novel. 
 Some scenes (spiritualism, circus) were taken from early Bulgakov's short stories, not from the novel.
 One of the scientists who witness the transformation of Sharik into a human is called Professor Persikov. He is the protagonist of another of Bulgakov's science-fiction novel, The Fatal Eggs.

Awards and honors
Prix Italia (1989)
Vasilyev Brothers State Prize of the RSFSR (1990)

See also
 Dog's Heart, a 1976 joint Italian-German comedy film directed by Alberto Lattuada based on a novel Heart of a Dog by Mikhail Bulgakov

References

External links

Secrets of our cinema. "Heart of a Dog". www.tvc.ru (video)

1988 films
1988 in the Soviet Union
Soviet science fiction films
Soviet television films
1980s Russian-language films
Lenfilm films
Soviet black-and-white films
Experimental medical treatments in fiction
Films based on works by Mikhail Bulgakov
Films set in the 1920s
Films set in Moscow
Films set in the Soviet Union
Films shot in Saint Petersburg
Films based on Russian novels
Films directed by Vladimir Bortko
Films about size change
1988 science fiction films
Television shows directed by Vladimir Bortko